Elsa Freire (born 12 August 1974) is an Angolan swimmer. She competed at the 1988 Summer Olympics and the 1992 Summer Olympics.

References

External links
 

1974 births
Living people
Angolan female swimmers
Olympic swimmers of Angola
Swimmers at the 1988 Summer Olympics
Swimmers at the 1992 Summer Olympics
Angolan people of Portuguese descent